Fort Neoheroka (or just Neoheroka, Neyuherú·kęʼ in Tuscarora), or Nooherooka,  is the name of a stronghold constructed in what is now Greene County, North Carolina by the Tuscarora tribe during the Tuscarora War of 1711–1715. In March 1713, the fort was besieged and ultimately attacked by a colonial force consisting of an army from the neighboring Province of South Carolina, under the command of Colonel James Moore and made up mainly of Indians including Yamasee, Apalachee, Catawba, and Cherokee. The 1713 siege lasted for more than three weeks, from around March 1 to March 22, 1713. Hundreds of men, women and children were burned to death in a fire that destroyed the fort. Approximately 170 more were killed outside the fort while approximately 400 were taken to South Carolina where they were sold into slavery. The defeat of the Tuscaroras, once the most powerful Indian tribe in the Province of North Carolina, opened up North Carolina's interior to further settlement. The supremacy of the Tuscaroras in the colony was broken forever, and most moved north to live among the Iroquois. On July 17, 2009, the Fort Neoheroka Site was added to the National Register of Historic Places.

See also
 Colonial history of the United States
 History of North Carolina
 National Register of Historic Places listings in North Carolina

References

External links
 Fort Neoheroka Excavation and Artifacts, tuscaroras.com
 Nooherooka 300th Commemoration, www.neyuheruke.org

1713 disestablishments in the Thirteen Colonies
Archaeological sites on the National Register of Historic Places in North Carolina
Conflicts in 1713
1713 in the Thirteen Colonies
1713 in North Carolina
Neoheroka
Buildings and structures in Greene County, North Carolina
Massacres in the Thirteen Colonies
Massacres of Native Americans
National Register of Historic Places in Greene County, North Carolina
Native American history of North Carolina
Tuscarora
Neoheroka
Neoheroka
C